"Can't Deny Me" is a song by the American alternative rock band Pearl Jam. The song was released on March 10, 2018 as a digital download exclusively on Pearl Jam's Ten Club fan club, and was released as a single via streaming and digital download on March 12, 2018. "Can't Deny Me" peaked at No. 11 on Billboards Mainstream Rock chart. Originally announced as a track from the band's then-untitled forthcoming album, the song was left off Gigaton (2020).

Release 
Pearl Jam posted a 25-second preview of "Can't Deny Me" on Twitter on March 10, 2018. The song was released as a surprise download to Pearl Jam's Ten Club members on the same day. It was also streamed on Sirius XM's Pearl Jam Radio. On March 12, 2018, the single was made available for streaming and digital download. The song was uploaded to the band's official YouTube channel on March 14, 2018.

Bassist Jeff Ament created the single's artwork in collaboration with Pearl Jam's longtime videographer, Kevin Shuss.

Live performances 
Pearl Jam performed the song for the first time during their concert at Movistar Arena in Santiago, Chile on March 13, 2018. Lead singer Eddie Vedder, speaking in Spanish, dedicated the song to "the incredible students in Florida and the United States, who survived a terrible tragedy. We will all be protesting tomorrow throughout the United States," Vedder said in reference to the nationwide school walkout in protest of gun violence that took place on March 14, 2018.

While introducing the song at Pearl Jam's concert in Amsterdam on June 13, 2018, Vedder sarcastically told the crowd that the song "has nothing to do with Donald Trump", and "I wouldn't want to waste my breath."

Personnel 
 Eddie Vedder – lead vocals
 Mike McCready – lead guitar
 Stone Gossard – rhythm guitar
 Jeff Ament – bass
 Matt Cameron – drums

Chart positions

References

External links 

"Can't Deny Me" on Setlist.fm

2018 songs
2018 singles
Pearl Jam songs
Songs written by Eddie Vedder
Songs written by Mike McCready
Song recordings produced by Brendan O'Brien (record producer)
Monkeywrench Records singles